Matt Mustchin (born 2 February 1977) is a former New Zealand rugby union footballer. He played for Edinburgh Rugby in the Celtic League. Prior to signing with Edinburgh, he played for Ulster Rugby. His usual position was a lock. Despite his New Zealand birth Mustchin was selected in the reserves for Scotland in its test versus his native New Zealand All Blacks on 8 November 2008.

External links
 ERC Rugby profile
 Mustchin signs for Edinburgh
 2Rugby profile

1977 births
Living people
New Zealand rugby union players
Rugby union locks
Ulster Rugby players
Scottish rugby union players
Scotland international rugby union players
Expatriate rugby union players in Scotland
New Zealand expatriate sportspeople in Scotland
Expatriate rugby union players in Northern Ireland
New Zealand expatriate sportspeople in Northern Ireland
Rugby union players from Christchurch
Belfast Harlequins rugby union players